Under a Mediterranean Sky is the 26th studio album by English guitarist and songwriter Steve Hackett. It was released on 22 January 2021 on Inside Out Music and is his first acoustic and entirely instrumental album since Tribute (2008).

Background
Under a Mediterranean Sky is Hackett's first acoustic album since Tribute (2008), which saw him pay homage to various composers. The album originated in March 2020, when his North American tour was cut short due to the COVID-19 pandemic, which saw him return to England without his electric guitars. The situation left Hackett at home with just his acoustic instruments, including his nylon guitar, and the opportunity to work on a new acoustic project. Hackett had discussions with his label, Inside Out Music, regarding if his next studio album can be acoustic or rock-oriented, and both ideas were green-lit, so he thought the time was right to do an acoustic album. Around this time, Hackett and his longtime producer and keyboardist Roger King decided to upgrade their software and purchase new orchestral samples.
A series of videos were shot while Hackett and his wife Jo were visiting the places depicted on the album, including footage from Jo herself and from Paul Gosling.

Release
The album was released on 22 January 2021. It is available in a limited edition CD digipak, a 2 LP and single CD set with a booklet, and on digital platforms.

Track listing

Personnel
Music
Steve Hackett – nylon guitar, steel guitar, 12-string guitar, charango, Iraqi oud
Roger King – keyboards, programming, orchestral arrangements
John Hackett – flute on "Casa del Fauno"
Rob Townsend – flute on "Casa del Fauno", soprano saxophone on "The Dervish and The Djin"
Franck Avril – oboe on "Andalusian Heart"
Malik Mansurov – tar on "Sirocco" and "The Dervish and The Djin"
Arsen Petrosyan – duduk on "The Dervish and The Djin"
Christine Townsend – violin and viola on "The Memory of Myth" and "Andalusian Heart"

Production
Steve Hackett – production
Roger King – production, mixing at Siren

Charts

References

2021 albums
Steve Hackett albums
Inside Out Music albums